La Vera is a comarca (county, but with no administrative role) in Extremadura, western Spain. The largest town is Jaraíz de la Vera.

Located at the feet of the Sierra de Gredos mountain range, in the Tiétar river valley, the comarca is economically based on agriculture. It is the home of the highly sought-after Pimentón de la Vera, which has achieved “Protected Denomination of Origin” status.

Province of Cáceres
Comarcas of Extremadura